The 1903 Rutgers Queensmen football team represented Rutgers University as an independent during the 1903 college football season. In their first season under head coach Oliver D. Mann, the Queensmen compiled a 4–4–1 record and were outscored by their opponents, 110 to 94. The team captain, for the second consecutive year, was Alfred Ellet Hitchner.

Schedule

References

Rutgers
Rutgers Scarlet Knights football seasons
Rutgers Queensmen football